Cassida flaveola, also known as the pale tortoise beetle, is a brownish coloured beetle in the leaf beetle family.

Distribution
The beetle is found in the Palearctic realm, east up to the Russian Far East.

Ecology
The host plants are Caryophyllaceae species, including Cerastium vulgatum, Honckenya peploides, Malachium aquaticum, Spergula arvensis, Spergula nemorum, Stellaria graminea and Stellaria media.

References

Cassidinae
Beetles described in 1794
Taxa named by Carl Peter Thunberg
Beetles of Europe
Palearctic insects